The Third Decade is a 1984 album by the Art Ensemble of Chicago released on the ECM label.

Reception

In his review for AllMusic, Stephen Cook stated "For the Art Ensemble of Chicago, Third Decade marked both the end of their relationship with the ECM label and the beginning of a more streamlined stretch of music making. The band would cut back on their once predominant, free-form explorations to make room for more bebop and crossover material".
The Penguin Guide to Jazz on CD reviewed the album negatively, calling it "nothing so much as the atrophy of a once-radical band."

Track listing
 "Prayer for Jimbo Kwesi" (Joseph Jarman) - 9:52  
 "Funky Aeco" (Art Ensemble of Chicago) - 7:43  
 "Walking in the Moonlight" (Roscoe Mitchell) - 4:11  
 "The Bell Piece" (Mitchell) - 6:07  
 "Zero" (Lester Bowie) - 6:00  
 "Third Decade" (Art Ensemble of Chicago) - 8:19  
Recorded June, 1984 in Ludwigsburg

Personnel
Lester Bowie: trumpet, fluegelhorn
Malachi Favors Maghostut: bass, percussion instruments
Joseph Jarman: saxophones, clarinets, percussion instruments, synthesizer 
Roscoe Mitchell: saxophones, clarinets, flute, percussion instruments 
Don Moye: drums, percussion

References

1984 albums
ECM Records albums
Art Ensemble of Chicago albums
Albums produced by Manfred Eicher